The Iola Cubs was the first and primary name of the Class Kansas–Oklahoma–Missouri League minor league baseball team based in Iola, Kansas, USA, that played in 1946 and 1947. The Iola Cubs were preceded by other early 1900s Iola minor league teams and succeeded by the Iola Indians. Iola won league championships in 1904 and 1946.

History
The 1946 Iola Cubs were the first professional baseball team based in Iola since the 1908 Iola Champs. The Iola Cubs were an affiliate of the Chicago Cubs, playing in the Kansas-Oklahoma-Missouri League. Managed by Al Reitz both years, the team finished second and third in the standings in 1946 and 1947, respectively, and reached the league finals both seasons.

Remaining in the Kansas-Oklahoma-Missouri League, Iola became an affiliate of the Cleveland Indians in 1948 and played as the Iola Indians in 1948-1952. After disbanding in 1953, the Iola Indians played a final season in the Western Association in 1954.

Decades earlier, the Iola Gasbags (1902, 1904) and Iola Gaslighters (1903) played in the  Missouri Valley League. The 1906 Iola Grays, of the Kansas State League, moved to Cherryvale, Kansas on June 15, 1906, becoming the Cherryvale Boosters. The 1908 Iola Champs, of the Oklahoma-Kansas League, had disbanded on July 8, 1908.

The ballpark
For the duration of the professional franchises, Iola home games were played at Riverside Municipal Ballpark, which is within Riverside Park. The ballpark was a Works Project Administration project. Located at 418 Park Avenue and South State Street in Iola, Kansas, the ballpark and adjacent park grounds are still in use today. The ballpark with a track and stands are utilized by Iola's USD 257 school district sports teams.

Notable alumni
 Woody Fair (1952, MGR)
 Larry Milton (1904)
 Willie Ramsdell (1954, Player/MGR)
 Al Reitz (1946-1948)
 Floyd Temple (1952, MGR)
 Bill Upton (1949)

Season-by-season

References

Defunct minor league baseball teams
Baseball teams established in 1946
Baseball teams disestablished in 1954
1946 establishments in Kansas
1954 disestablishments in Kansas
Professional baseball teams in Kansas
Chicago Cubs minor league affiliates
Cleveland Guardians minor league affiliates
Allen County, Kansas
Defunct baseball teams in Kansas